William Erastus Upjohn (June 15, 1853 – October 18, 1932) was an American medical doctor and both founder and president of The Upjohn Pharmaceutical Company. He was named Person of the Century by the Kalamazoo, Michigan, newspaper.

Early life 
Upjohn was one of twelve children born to Dr. Uriah Upjohn, pioneer doctor, and his wife, Maria Mills Upjohn, in Kalamazoo, Michigan.

In 1875, he graduated from the University of Michigan medical school.

Career 
Upjohn practiced medicine for 10 years in Hastings, Michigan.

In his home, Dr. Upjohn experimented with ways to improve the means of administering medicine. He invented the easily digested friable pill, for which he received a patent in 1885. In 1886, he founded The Upjohn Pharmaceutical Company in Kalamazoo to manufacture friable pills and served 40 years as company president.

Brook Lodge 
The Brook Lodge Hotel & Conference Resort owes its origins to Dr. W.E. Upjohn, founder of the Upjohn Company. Dr. Will, as he was known, bought the  farm in 1895. One of the original buildings on the property was a creamery, which he soon converted to a summer cottage for himself and his family.

This peaceful country retreat eventually became his preferred location for private and business entertaining. In 1956, Twenty-four years after Dr. Upjohn's death, the Upjohn Company purchased Brook Lodge from the family estate and began its transformation into a full service conference center for the exclusive use of Upjohn employees. Its beautiful surroundings make it a perfect place to hold social events and meetings for guests and employees.

The history of how the buildings on the grounds evolved is just as interesting.  During the time that the creamery was being converted to family living quarters,  Dr. Upjohn erected a combination garage and guest house in the spot where the Conference Hall now stands. When the Conference Hall was built, the guest house   now the Carriage House   was moved to its present location.  In 1910 Brookside Cottage was built by Dr. Upjohn for his gardener.

Though Dr. Upjohn found his Brook Lodge retreat an ideal location for doing business, he did not like the smell of cooking interfering with his work. So in 1927, he built the Dining Hall which he used for both private and business entertaining. The original carpet in the Dining Hall has since been replaced with a custom design incorporating Dr. Upjohn’s beloved peonies.

The original landscaping of Brook Lodge included a swimming pool, tennis court, and walking paths. Dr. Upjohn also planted thousands of trees and flowers. Though iris were his first love, he turned his attention to peonies which flourished in the local soil. According to varying reports, Dr. Upjohn grew from 400 to 675 varieties of peonies,  of glorious red, white and pink blossoms.

Alongside the mill pond, also part of the original landscaping, is a lovely Japanese garden. In 1967, a Japanese guest who was particularly pleased with his stay at Brook Lodge, sent an authentic temple lantern as a token of his appreciation. With the help of a Japanese architect who insisted that every element "feel right" in order to "look right," the temple garden came to life.

Brook Lodge Conference Center occupies  of grounds, of which 40 are maintained for guests' enjoyment. Brook Lodge Hotel and Conference Resort closed at the end of 2009. Since then, the resort has been vacant and closed to public with warnings of prosecution when people entered any property of the former Brook Lodge.

Humanitarian contributions
Dr. Upjohn helped establish the commissioner-manager form of government in Kalamazoo. He provided the seed for the Kalamazoo Community Foundation, established the W. E. Upjohn Institute for Employment Research, and contributed to the Kalamazoo Civic Auditorium. Known as a lover of flowers, he established gardens at Brook Lodge, his summer home near Augusta.

Personal life 
Dr. Upjohn married Rachel Phoebe Babcock on December 24, 1878. They had five children: Rachel Winifred Upjohn Smith Light (1880-1929), William Harold Upjohn (1884-1928), Mary Upjohn (1889-1889, infant death), Dorothy Upjohn DeLano Dalton (1890-1981), and Genevieve Upjohn Gilmore (1894-1990). Rachel Phoebe Babcock Upjohn died on July 4, 1905, after twenty-seven years of marriage.

On December 25, 1913, Dr. Upjohn married again, this time to his neighbor Carrie Maria Sherwood Gilmore, widow of James F. Gilmore, one of the founders of the Gilmore Brothers department store.

Suzanne Upjohn DeLano Parish, Dr. Upjohn's granddaughter via his daughter Dorothy Upjohn DeLano Dalton, was a Women Airforce Service Pilots (WASP) during World War II, and founded the Kalamazoo Aviation History Museum, later named the Air Zoo.

See also 
 Upjohn
 W. E. Upjohn Institute for Employment Research

References

Further reading

External links
 Kalamazoo Public Library, William E. Upjohn: Person of the Century
 Upjohn Family Papers: 1795-1974 at Bentley Historical Library at the University of Michigan

1853 births
1932 deaths
People from Kalamazoo, Michigan
Physicians from Michigan
University of Michigan Medical School alumni
People from Hastings, Michigan